"You Know Me" is the second single by 2 Pistols from his debut album Death Before Dishonor. The single features Ray J. Like the first single, "She Got It," this song is produced by J.U.S.T.I.C.E. League. It was released for digital download on May 27, 2008, three weeks before Death Before Dishonor.

Music video
The video for the song premiered on BET's 106 & Park on June 17, 2008.

Charts

Release history

References

2008 singles
2008 songs
Ray J songs
Universal Republic Records singles
Songs written by Ray J
Song recordings produced by J.U.S.T.I.C.E. League
Songs written by Erik Ortiz
Songs written by Kevin Crowe